T-Rex: Back to the Cretaceous is a 1998 American edutainment adventure film shot for the IMAX 3D format. The film is directed by Brett Leonard. Executive producer/co-writer Andrew Gellis and producers Antoine Compin and Charis Horton also make up the production team. Liz Stauber and Peter Horton star, alongside Kari Coleman, Tuck Milligan, and Laurie Murdoch. When a museum accident transports teenager Ally Hayden on an adventure back in time, she explores the terrain and territory of life-sized dinosaurs, even during a nose-to-nose encounter with a female Tyrannosaurus. The film is among the few IMAX films that are considered "pure entertainment", though it still is considered rather educational by the mainstream audience.

Plot
16-year-old Ally Hayden is the daughter of Dr. Donald Hayden, a world-famous paleontologist and museum curator. She loves dinosaurs and longs to be able to accompany him to one of the nearby paleontological digs, but her father thinks this is too dangerous and she has to settle for giving museum tours instead.

A mysterious accident at the lab revolving an oblong fossil egg happens while Ally's father is away at a dig site with his assistant, and Ally is magically transported back in time. Among the various time periods she visits are the Late Cretaceous, when the Tyrannosaurus rex and Pteranodon existed. Ally is also transported to the early 20th century where she meets renowned historical figures in the world of paleontology. These include dinosaur painter Charles Knight and Barnum Brown, arguably one of the most famous paleontologists in early fossil-hunting history.

The shining moment of her trip to the past, however, is when Ally discovers a Tyrannosaurus rex nest (with up to five eggs) and then defends the nest from an Ornithomimus, earning the mother T. rex'''s respect to the point where Ally actually strokes the mother T. rex (and befriends her). That is, before the meteoroid (at the end of the Cretaceous Period) impacts Earth, blasting Ally back into the present day. There, she is reunited with her father. As they leave the museum, the fossil egg begins to shake and, with only the museum kitten watching, it hatches into a living dinosaur egg and breaks apart, revealing a still living baby Tyrannosaurus.

Cast
 Liz Stauber as Ally Hayden
 Peter Horton as Dr. Donald Hayden
 Kari Coleman as Elizabeth Sample
 Charlene Sashuk as Jesse Hayden
 Dan Libman as The Guard
 Tuck Milligan as Charles Knight
 Laurie Murdoch as Barnum Brown
 Joshua Silberg and Alex Hudson as Young boys
 Chris Enright as Dig assistant No. 2

Dinosaurs and other animals
 Tyrannosaurus (both living and a skeleton)
 Ornithomimus (both living and a skeleton)
 Pteranodon (both living and a skeleton)
 Parasaurolophus (both living and a skeleton)
 Dryptosaurus (both living and a painting)
 Albertosaurus (skeleton)
 Allosaurus (skeleton)
 Brontosaurus (skeleton)
 Camarasaurus (skeleton)
 Centrosaurus/Monoclonius (skeleton)
 Chasmosaurus (skeleton)
 Daspletosaurus (skeleton)
 Dimetrodon (skeleton)
 Edmontosaurus (skeleton)
 Euoplocephalus (skeleton)
 Hypacrosaurus (skeleton)
 Megacerops (museum banner)
 Lambeosaurus (skeleton)
 Oviraptor (skeleton)
 Smilodon (skeleton)
 Stegosaurus (skeleton)
 Struthiomimus (skeleton)
 Triceratops (skeleton)
 Woolly mammoth (both skeleton and a painting)

Production

Principal photography began on September 22, 1997, on location at Dinosaur Provincial Park in the Badlands region of Alberta, Canada, and near the town of Brooks. Filming began by capturing the scenes in which Ally Hayden time-travels back to the turn of the century to go on expedition with famous bone-hunter Barnum Brown.

Filming continued for two weeks on location in Dinosaur Provincial Park. Yet the filmmakers faced a challenge in finding a realistic environment to set the live-action filming portion for the Cretaceous period sequences when Ally finds herself wandering amidst the lush vegetation of 66 million years ago. The location used to film Cretaceous period scenes in the end was in the Olympia rain forest in upper Washington state.

The special considerations that must be made when working with IMAX 3D presentation also made it crucial that the background features of the shooting locations were ideal.

Besides shooting locations, extensive computer-generated imagery was also employed to ensure the realism of the dinosaurs depicted in the film. Models had to be sculpted and digitized, with details such as texturing crucial to the process. The filmmakers of the next year's television documentary series Walking with Dinosaurs'' also faced similar challenges.

Reception

The film received positive notices from critics. On review aggregator website Rotten Tomatoes, the film has a 70% rating from 20 critics, with an average rating of 6.2/10.

References

External links
 
 
 

1998 films
1990s 3D films
1990s adventure films
American 3D films
American adventure films
1990s English-language films
Films directed by Brett Leonard
Films about dinosaurs
Films about time travel
Films scored by William Ross
1990s American films